Korean chili peppers or Korean hot peppers, also known as Korean red, Korean dark green, or Korean long green peppers according to color (ripening stages), are medium-sized chili peppers of the species Capsicum annuum. The chili pepper is long, slender and mild in flavor and spice. Green (unripe) chili peppers measure around 1,500 Scoville heat units.

Names 
In Korean, the chili peppers are most often called , which means "chili pepper". Green ones are called , and red ones are called .

Introduction to Korea 
Chili peppers, which originated in the Americas, were introduced by Portuguese traders to Korea, via Japan, in the late 16th century. The first mention of chili pepper in Korea is found in Collected Essays of Jibong, an encyclopedia published in 1614. Farm Management, a book from around 1700, discussed the cultivation methods of chili peppers.

Culinary use 

Gochugaru, also known as Korean chili powder, is chili powder or flakes used in Korean cuisine. The name gochugaru is derived from Korean , where  means 'chili pepper' and  means 'powder'. In English, gochugaru usually refers to the seedless, Korean variety of chili powder. It has a vibrant red color, the texture may vary from fine powder to flakes, and the heat level from mildly hot to very hot. Traditionally made from sun-dried Korean red chili peppers, gochugaru has a complex flavor profile with spicy, sweet, and slightly smoky tastes. Gochugaru made from Cheongyang chili peppers is finer and hotter.

Gallery

See also 
 Cheongyang chili pepper

References 

Capsicum cultivars
Chili peppers
Korean vegetables